Stokes Bay railway station served the town of Gosport, Hampshire, England, from 1865 to 1915 on the Stokes Bay line.

History 
The station was opened on 6 April 1863 by the Stokes Bay Railway and Pier Company. It was situated on a pier at the end of Military Road. It was intended to carry passengers from Gosport so they could use the ferry which went to the Isle of Wight. It had waiting rooms and booking offices at the end of each platform. The pier closed after an examination in 1896 but a temporary platform was built on land so passengers could still use it. The station closed on 1 November 1915. The station and pier was demolished after closure. Part of the trackbed of the railway towards Gosport Road is now a footpath.

References 

Disused railway stations in Hampshire
Former London and South Western Railway stations
Railway stations in Great Britain opened in 1863
Railway stations in Great Britain closed in 1915
1863 establishments in England
1915 disestablishments in England